Bermudezia is a genus of land snails with an operculum, terrestrial gastropod mollusks in the family Pomatiidae.

Species 
Species within the genus Bermudezia include:
Bermudezia bermudezi (Torre & Bartsch, 1941)
Bermudezia biayensis (Torre & Bartsch, 1941)
Bermudezia capestanyi (Torre & Bartsch, 1941)
Bermudezia euglypta (Torre & Bartsch, 1941)
Bermudezia eurystoma (Torre & Bartsch, 1941)
Bermudezia lirata (Torre & Bartsch, 1941)
Bermudezia najazaensis (Torre & Bartsch, 1941)
Bermudezia obliterata (Torre & Bartsch, 1941)
Bermudezia payroli (Torre & Bartsch, 1941)
Bermudezia sifontesi (Torre & Bartsch, 1941)

References 

Pomatiidae